Sesede Terziyan (born in 1981) is a German actress based in Berlin.

Biography 
Sesede Terziyan was raised by Armenian parents from Yozgat in Turkey, growing up in Lower Saxony and later in Baden-Württemberg. Terziyan has said that she always had a strong desire to express herself, at first through music, but found she could be her true self in the theatre. She trained at the Ernst Busch Academy of Dramatic Arts, and on graduating in 2005, co-founded the independent theatre company Eigenreich, appearing in its opening production, Sarah Kane's 4.48 Psychosis.

Early stage appearances included Death of a Salesman at the Deutsches Theater Berlin and Bloody Homeland at the Maxim Gorki Theatre. She was engaged at Deutsches Theater (Göttingen) in 2006, returning to freelance work in 2008. In 2011, she took the teacher's role in Verrücktes Blut (Mad Blood), a play based on a French film, La Journée de la jupe, at the Ballhaus Naunynstraße in Berlin. The play was developed by Nurkan Erpulat and Jens Hillje through a process of improvisation, co-inspiration and ensemble work. In 2013, she returned to the Maxim Gorki Theater, under the artistic direction of Şermin Langhoff, appearing in several productions including Rewitching Europe and Berlin Oranienplatz.

In 2020, as chief detective Jasmin Sayed, she played the first female chief of a fictionalized Wasserschutzpolizei (river police) in the ARD series, WaPo Berlin.

Filmography

Cinema 

 2005: Cataract (short)
 2008: Speed Racer
 2011: Almanya: Welcome to Germany
 2014: 
 2016: Der Kuaför aus der Keupstraße (documentary)
 2018: 25 km/h
 2018: Skin Creepers

TV 

 2006: SOKO Köln
 2006: Abschnitt 40
 2007: Vertraute Angst
 2007: Tatort: Roter Tod
 2007: Tatort: Wem Ehre gebürt
 2007–2009: Familie Sonnenfeld (TV series)
 2008: Tatort: Schatten der Angst
 2008: Unschuldig
 2008: In letzter Sekunde
 2008: Mordkommission Istanbul
 2009: Ayla
 2010: SOKO Leipzig
 2010: Der letzte Bulle (TV series)
 2010: Der Doc und die Hexe (TV series)
 2011: SOKO Kitzbühel
 2013: Tatort: Melinda
 2014: 
 2017: Der Gutachter
 2017: Der 7. Tag
 2019: Familie Bundschuh – Wir machen Abitur
 2020: WaPo Berlin (TV series)
 2021: Tatort: Die dritte Haut

References

External links 

 Sesede Terziyan
 

1981 births
German stage actresses
German film actresses
Living people